The 2005–06 UEFA Cup,  the 35th edition of the UEFA Cup, was won by Sevilla, beating Middlesbrough in the final. It was the first victory for Sevilla in a European competition, and the first appearance by Middlesbrough in a European final. The final took place at Philips Stadion, in Eindhoven, Netherlands. The match was refereed by Herbert Fandel. Middlesbrough sealed their place in the final on the back of two dramatic comebacks. In the quarter finals they beat FC Basel of Switzerland 4–3 on aggregate (after losing the first leg 2–0 and being 1–0 down in the second leg, they scored 4 goals), this put them into the semi–final to face Steaua București. The first leg finished 1–0 to Steaua, and the second leg (at the Riverside Stadium again) finished 4–2 (after being 2–0 down). Sevilla went on to defend the trophy the following year.

CSKA Moscow were the defending champions, but were eliminated in the group stage.

Association team allocation
113 teams qualified directly for the 2005–06 UEFA Cup from 52 UEFA associations. An additional three teams qualified via the UEFA Fair Play league, while 27 further teams qualified at various stages from the UEFA Intertoto Cup and the UEFA Champions League.

Below is the final qualification scheme for the 2005–06 UEFA Cup:

Associations 1–6 each have 3 teams qualify, with the exception of England (2) who have 2 teams
Associations 7–8 each have 4 teams qualify
Associations 9–15 each have 2 teams qualify
Associations 16–20 each have 3 teams qualify
Associations 21–49 each have 2 teams qualify, with the exception of Liechtenstein (43) who have 1 team
Associations 50–52 each have 1 team qualify
plus
Winner of previous years' tournament
3 UEFA Fair Play entries
3 winners of the 2005 UEFA Intertoto Cup
16 losers from the UEFA Champions League third qualifying round
8 third-placed teams from the UEFA Champions League group stage

Association ranking

Notes
(CLTH): Berth vacated due to being taken by the UEFA Champions League title holders.
(UCL): Teams transferred from the Champions League.
(UIC): Additional berths for the 2005 UEFA Intertoto Cup winners.
(FP): Additional Fair Play berth (Germany, Norway, Denmark).

Distribution

Each association enters a certain number of teams to the UEFA Cup based on its league coefficient. Through domestic competitions (national championships and cups and league cups in certain countries) an association may qualify up to four teams. The following amendments were made to the 2005–06 qualification scheme:

The defending UEFA Cup holder CSKA Moscow already qualified for the 2nd qualifying round, which means that the first UEFA Cup entrant of the 25th and 26th associations on the ranking list (Hungary and Romania) will gain direct access to the second qualifying round of the UEFA Cup.
Because Liverpool entered the first qualifying round of the Champions League as title holders, the first UEFA Cup entrant of 11th and 12th associations on the ranking list (Scotland and Belgium) will gain direct access to the first round of the UEFA Cup.
In Kazakhstan, only Kairat Almaty obtained a UEFA licence for the 2005–06 season. The other teams from Kazakhstan were not allowed to compete. Therefore, the first UEFA Cup entrant of the 27th and 28th countries on the ranking list (Slovakia and Slovenia) will gain direct access to the second qualifying round of the UEFA Cup.
In Serbia and Montenegro, the cup winner Železnik was replaced by OFK Beograd because they did not obtain a UEFA licence.
In Bosnia and Herzegovina, the cup winner FK Sarajevo was replaced by Široki Brijeg, and 2nd in the league Zeljeznicar was replaced by Žepče, because they did not obtain a UEFA licence.

Teams
The labels in the parentheses show how each team qualified for the place of its starting round:
 TH: Title holders
 CW: Cup winners
 CR: Cup runners-up
 LC: League Cup winners
 Nth: League position
 PO: End-of-season European competition play-offs (winners or position)
 IC: Intertoto Cup
 FP: Fair play
 CL: Relegated from the Champions League
 GS: Third-placed teams from the group stage
 Q3: Losers from the third qualifying round

Notes

Qualifying rounds

First qualifying round

|-
!colspan="5"|Southern-Mediterranean region
|-

|-
!colspan="5"|Central-East region
|-

|-
!colspan="5"|Northern region
|-

|}

Second qualifying round

|-
!colspan="5"|
Southern-Mediterranean region
|-

|-
!colspan="5"|Central-East region
|-

|-
!colspan="5"|Northern region
|-

|}

First round

|}

Group stage

Based on paragraph 4.06 in the UEFA regulations for the current season, tiebreakers, if necessary, are applied in the following order:
Cumulative goal difference in group matches
Total goals scored in group matches
Away goals scored in group matches
Higher number of UEFA coefficient points accumulated by the club in question, as well as its association, over the previous five seasons (see paragraph 6.03 of the UEFA regulations)

Group A

Group B

Group C

Group D

Group E

Group F

Group G

Group H

Knockout stage

Bracket

Round of 32
The top three teams from each group were joined by the eight teams that finished third in their groups in the Champions League.

Round of 16

Quarter-finals

Semi-finals

Final

Top goalscorers

See also
2005–06 UEFA Champions League
2005 UEFA Intertoto Cup
2006 UEFA Super Cup

References

External links

2005–06 All matches UEFA Cup – season at UEFA website
Results at RSSSF.com
Qualification and Seeding Information
 All scorers 2005–06 UEFA Cup according to (excluding preliminary round) according to protocols UEFA + all scorers preliminary round
2005/06 UEFA Cup – results and line-ups (archive)
Group stage lineup complete – list of the group stage participants with club coefficients, the draw was based on

 
2005–06 in European football
UEFA Cup seasons